Elections to the Madhya Pradesh Legislative Assembly were held in February 1962. 1,336 candidates contested for the 288 constituencies in the Assembly. The Indian National Congress won the most seats and Dwarka Prasad Mishra was sworn in for his second term as the Chief Minister.

After the passing of The Delimitation of Parliamentary and Assembly Constituencies Order, 1961, double-member constituencies were eliminated and Madhya Pradesh's Legslative Assembly was assigned 288 single-member constituencies.

Results

Elected members

Bypolls

See also
List of constituencies of the Chhattisgarh Legislative Assembly
List of constituencies of the Madhya Pradesh Legislative Assembly

References

1962
1962
Madhya Pradesh